Kingdom, or Kingdom Pro Wrestling, was a Japanese shoot style professional wrestling promotion that held events in 1997 and 1998. It was considered a continuation of UWF International, having most of its former roster: Nobuhiko Takada, Yoji Anjo, Kazushi Sakuraba, Daijiro Matsui, Naoki Sano, Masahito Kakihara, Yoshihiro Takayama, Kenichi Yamamoto and Hiromitsu Kanehara. 

Several wrestlers began pursuing mixed martial arts during their time at the promotion, most notably Kazushi Sakuraba who won the UFC Japan: Ultimate Japan heavyweight tournament representing Kingdom. The promotion is also a predecessor to the Pride Fighting Championships, which held their first event towards the demise of Kingdom.

History

Kingdom's popularity did not reach or surpass that of the UWF International. Attempts to rectify this by using talent from other shoot-style promotions including Battlarts did little to help, and it seemed that in the eyes of the Japanese fans the era of shoot style wrestling had ended. As a result, Kingdom would go out of business in March 1998.

In the aftermath, Matsui, Sakuraba, Sano and Takada focused on competing for mixed martial arts promotion Pride as part of the Takada Dojo camp. Yamamoto and Kanehara jumped to Rings, which had been a splinter promotion formed from the UWF much like UWF International had been. Meanwhile Kakihara and Takayama joined All Japan Pro Wrestling as free agents, while Anjo dabbled in K-1 before later reappearing in All Japan Pro Wrestling and Dream Stage Entertainment's Hustle as "Commander Anjoe".

A former trainee of the Kingdom dojo, Hidetada Irie, who debuted at Kingdom's final event, formed a successor promotion called "Kingdom Ehrgeiz", with himself as the top star. The promotion, however, is very obscure and only promotes cards periodically.

See also

Professional wrestling in Japan

References

External links
 KINGDOM history, stats, results, & more

Japanese professional wrestling promotions
1997 establishments in Japan
1998 disestablishments in Japan